Michael Francis William Passey (born 6 June 1937) is an English former first-class cricketer who played a single match for Worcestershire against Glamorgan in 1953, aged only 16. He took a single wicket, that of Phil Clift, but conceded 57 runs from his 12 overs. Batting at number 11, he was out for 1 in his only innings.

External links
 

1937 births
Living people
English cricketers
Worcestershire cricketers